Benthobatis is a genus of fish in the family Narcinidae with four currently recognized species.

Species
 Benthobatis kreffti Rincón, Stehmann & Vooren, 2001 (Brazilian blind electric ray)
 Benthobatis marcida B. A. Bean & A. C. Weed, 1909 (Blind torpedo)
 Benthobatis moresbyi Alcock, 1898 (Dark blind ray)
 Benthobatis yangi M. R. de Carvalho, Compagno & Ebert, 2003 (Taiwanese blind electric ray)

References

Narcinidae
Ray genera
Taxa named by Alfred William Alcock
Taxonomy articles created by Polbot